This is a list of properties and districts in Peach County, Georgia that are listed on the National Register of Historic Places (NRHP).

Current listings

|}

References

Peach
Buildings and structures in Peach County, Georgia